Thomas Hurdis D.D. (d. 29 March 1784) was a Canon of Windsor from 1766 to 1784

Family
He was the eldest surviving son of Thomas Hurdis (c.1674-1733) Vicar of Ringmer 1727–1733.

Career
He was educated at Merton College, Oxford where he graduated DD.

He was appointed:

Vicar of Seaford 1734 - 1779
Canon of York
Vicar of Amport, Hampshire
Custos of St Mary's Hospital, Chichester
Prebendary of Middleton in Chichester 1755 - 1784
Vicar of Wantage

He was appointed to the fourth stall in St George's Chapel, Windsor Castle in 1766 and held this until he died in 1784.

A monument to him was erected in Chichester Cathedral

Notes

1784 deaths
Canons of Windsor
Alumni of Merton College, Oxford
Year of birth missing